Kimberley Spiteri is an American make-up artist. She was nominated for an Academy Award in the category Best Makeup and Hairstyling for the film Mank. Spiteri also won an Primetime Emmy Award and was nominated for five more in the category Outstanding Hairstyling for her work on the television programs Six Feet Under, The Originals, The Marvelous Mrs. Maisel and television films Ike: Countdown to D-Day and Deadwood: The Movie.

Selected filmography 
 Mank (2020; co-nominated with Gigi Williams and Colleen LaBaff)

References

External links 

Living people
Year of birth missing (living people)
Place of birth missing (living people)
American make-up artists
Primetime Emmy Award winners